Samuel Néva  (born 15 May 1981, in Le Mans) is a French football player. He played for Apollon Limassol in the Marfin Laiki League in Cyprus.

External links 
 footballstats Profile
 eurosport.se Profile 

1981 births
Living people
French footballers
Footballers from Le Mans
Association football defenders
French expatriate footballers
Stade Lavallois players
Le Havre AC players
Grenoble Foot 38 players
R.W.D.M. Brussels F.C. players
F.C.V. Dender E.H. players
Apollon Limassol FC players
Ligue 2 players
Belgian Pro League players
Cypriot First Division players
Expatriate footballers in Belgium
Expatriate footballers in Cyprus